Colonia Benítez  is a village and municipality in Chaco Province in northern Argentina.
It was one of the first towns and agricultural settlements of the province, when the cultivation of cotton and various industries were the pillars of its development with over the years.

References

Populated places in Chaco Province